Psychophasma is a monotypic moth genus in the family Erebidae erected by Arthur Gardiner Butler in 1878. Its only species, Psychophasma erosa, was first described by Gottlieb August Wilhelm Herrich-Schäffer in 1858. It is found in Guatemala, Costa Rica, Mexico, Nicaragua, Panama, Ecuador, Venezuela, Suriname, French Guiana, Guyana, Brazil, Bolivia, Colombia and Peru.

References

Phaegopterina
Monotypic moth genera
Moths described in 1858
Moths of North America
Moths of South America